Euphorbia gottlebei is a species of plant in the family Euphorbiaceae. It is endemic to Madagascar.  Its natural habitat is rocky areas. It is threatened by habitat loss.

Description
Is a small shrub-like, succulent and thorny plant with an apical cyathium.

References

Endemic flora of Madagascar
Vulnerable plants
gottlebei
Taxonomy articles created by Polbot